Stefan Walter Hell HonFRMS (: born 23 December 1962) is a Romanian-German physicist and one of the directors of the Max Planck Institute for Biophysical Chemistry in Göttingen, Germany. He received the Nobel Prize in Chemistry in 2014 "for the development of super-resolved fluorescence microscopy", together with Eric Betzig and William Moerner.

Life 

Born into a Roman Catholic Banat Swabian family in Arad, Romania, he grew up at his parents'  home in nearby Sântana. Hell attended primary school there between 1969 and 1977. Subsequently, he attended one year of secondary education at the Nikolaus Lenau High School in Timișoara before leaving with his parents to West Germany in 1978. His father was an engineer and his mother a teacher; the family settled in Ludwigshafen after emigrating.

Hell began his studies at the Heidelberg University in 1981, where he received his doctorate in physics in 1990. His thesis advisor was the solid-state physicist Siegfried Hunklinger.  The title of the thesis was “Imaging of transparent microstructures in a confocal microscope”. He was an independent inventor for a short period thereafter working on improving depth (axial) resolution in confocal microscopy, which became later known as the 4Pi microscope. Resolution is the possibility to separate two similar objects in close proximity and is therefore the most important property of a microscope.

From 1991 to 1993, Hell worked at the European Molecular Biology Laboratory in Heidelberg, where he succeeded in demonstrating the principles of 4-Pi microscopy. From 1993 to 1996 he worked as a group leader at the University of Turku (Finland) in the department for Medical Physics, where he developed the principle for stimulated emission depletion STED microscopy. From 1993 to 1994 Hell was also for 6 months a visiting scientist at the University of Oxford (England).
He received his habilitation in physics from the University of Heidelberg in 1996. On 15 October 2002, Hell became a director of the Max Planck Institute for Biophysical Chemistry in Göttingen  and he established the department of Nanobiophotonics. Since 2003 Hell has also been the leader of the department "Optical Nanoscopy division" at the German Cancer Research Center (DKFZ) in Heidelberg and "non-budgeted professor" (apl. Prof.) in the Heidelberg University Faculty of Physics and Astronomy. Since 2004 he has been an honorary professor for experimental physics at the faculty of physics of the University of Göttingen.

With the invention and subsequent development of Stimulated Emission Depletion microscopy and related microscopy methods, he was able to show that one can substantially improve the resolving power of the fluorescence microscope, previously limited to half the wavelength of the employed light (> 200 nanometers). A microscope's resolution is its most important property. Hell was the first to demonstrate, both theoretically and experimentally, how one can decouple the resolution of the fluorescence microscope from diffraction and increase it to a fraction of the wavelength of light (to the nanometer scale). Ever since the work of Ernst Karl Abbe in 1873, this feat was not thought possible. For this achievement and its significance for other fields of science, such as the life-sciences and medical research, he received the 10th German Innovation Award (Deutscher Zukunftspreis) on 23 November 2006. He received the Nobel Prize in Chemistry in 2014, becoming the second Nobelist born in the Banat Swabian community (after Herta Müller, the 2009 recipient of the Nobel Prize in Literature).

, Hell has an h-index of 132 according to Google Scholar.

Awards 

 Prize of the International Commission for Optics, 2000
 Helmholtz-Award for metrology, Co-Recipient, 2001
 Berthold Leibinger Innovationspreis, 2002
 Carl-Zeiss Research Award, 2002
 Karl-Heinz-Beckurts-award, 2002
 C. Benz u. G. Daimler-Award of Berlin-Brandenburgisch academy, 2004
 Robert B. Woodward Scholar, Harvard University, Cambridge, MA, USA, 2006
 Innovation Award of the German Federal President, 2006
 Julius Springer Prize for Applied Physics, 2007
 Member of the Akademie der Wissenschaften zu Göttingen, 2007
 Gottfried Wilhelm Leibniz Prize, 2008
 Lower Saxony State Prize, 2008
 Nomination for European Inventor of the Year of the European Patent Office, 2008
 Method of the year 2008 in Nature Methods
 Otto-Hahn-Preis, 2009
 Ernst-Hellmut-Vits-Prize, 2010
 Hansen Family Award, 2011
 Körber European Science Prize, 2011 
 The Gothenburg Lise Meitner prize, 2010/11
 Meyenburg Prize, 2011
 Science Prize of the Fritz Behrens Foundation 2012
 Doctor Honoris Causa of Vasile Goldiș Western University of Arad, 2012
 Romanian Academy, Honorary Member, 2012
 Paul Karrer Gold Medal, University of Zürich, 2013
 Member of German National Academy of Sciences Leopoldina, 2013
  of the Leopoldina, 2013
 Kavli Prize, 2014
 Nobel Prize in Chemistry, 2014
 Romanian Royal Family: Knight Commander of the Order of the Crown, 2015
 Romania: Grand Cross of the Order of the Star of Romania, 2015
 Glenn T. Seaborg Medal, 2015
 Wilhelm Exner Medal, 2016
 Foreign associate of the National Academy of Sciences, 2016
 Honorary Fellow of the Royal Microscopical Society (HonFRMS) for his contributions to microscopy, 2017
 Fellow of the Norwegian Academy of Science and Letters.

Publications

References

External links 

 Chemistry Tree: Stefan W. Hell Details
 Curriculum vitae on the Website of Max Planck Institute for Biophysical Chemistry
 Stefan Hell Lecture: Super-Resolution: Overview and Stimulated Emission Depletion (STED) Microscopy, May 2013
 Innovation Award of the German Federal President
 List of articles from Steffan Hell
 
 

Living people
1962 births
Gottfried Wilhelm Leibniz Prize winners
21st-century German physicists
Heidelberg University alumni
People from Arad, Romania
Danube-Swabian people
Max Planck Society people
21st-century German chemists
Microscopists
German Nobel laureates
Nobel laureates in Chemistry
German people of German-Romanian descent
Romanian Nobel laureates
Honorary members of the Romanian Academy
Honorary fellows of the Royal Microscopical Society
Recipients of the Order of the Crown (Romania)
Commanders of the Order of the Crown (Romania)
Grand Crosses of the Order of the Star of Romania
Foreign associates of the National Academy of Sciences
Knights Commander of the Order of Merit of the Federal Republic of Germany
Recipients of the Order of Merit of Baden-Württemberg
Members of the Norwegian Academy of Science and Letters
Kavli Prize laureates in Nanoscience
Members of the Göttingen Academy of Sciences and Humanities
Max Planck Institute directors
Fellows of the American Physical Society